Brian Edward Bellows (born September 1, 1964) is a Canadian former professional ice hockey player. He played nearly 1,200 games in the National Hockey League (NHL) with the Minnesota North Stars, Montreal Canadiens, Tampa Bay Lightning, Mighty Ducks of Anaheim and the Washington Capitals. He was a member of the 1993 Stanley Cup-winning Montreal Canadiens.

Playing career
Bellows played junior hockey in the Ontario Hockey League with the Kitchener Rangers. During this time, he was featured in Sports Illustrated, which described him as the hottest prospect since Wayne Gretzky.In his two seasons with Kitchener, he captained the team to two consecutive Ontario Hockey League championships and two Memorial Cup finals, winning the trophy on their second attempt, 7-4 vs the Sherbrooke Beavers.

Bellows was drafted second overall by the Minnesota North Stars, who had acquired the draft pick in a trade with Detroit with the purpose of having a shot at Bellows. North Stars GM Lou Nanne sent Don Murdoch, Greg Smith, and a first round pick (Murray Craven) to the Wings in exchange for what later turned out to be the second overall draft pick. Bellows was often compared to Gretzky, which led to a tough rookie season. The pressure of such comparisons caused criticisms when he did not live up to them. Bellows improved greatly in the second half of the season and finished with 35 goals. In the playoffs that year, Bellows scored 9 points (5 goals, 4 assists) in 9 games.

Bellows played 10 seasons with the North Stars and was popular in Minnesota for his charity work, as well as his goal-scoring. He had a North Star record 342 goals in 753 games, peaking with 55 goals in 1989–90. In 1990–91, Bellows scored 29 points in the post-season to become the North Stars career playoff point leader, and took the North Stars to the Stanley Cup finals where they fell to the Pittsburgh Penguins.

When team captain Craig Hartsburg was injured partway through the 1983–84 season, Bellows was named interim captain for the remainder of the season. At 19 years and 4 months, Bellows became captain at an earlier age than Connor McDavid, Gabriel Landeskog and Sidney Crosby. However, because Bellows was an interim captain, McDavid is still considered the youngest captain in history.

On August 31, 1992, Bellows was traded to the Montreal Canadiens for Russ Courtnall. The trade angered Bellows at first, but he relished the chance to play for the Canadiens. In the 1992-93 NHL season his 88 points were the second highest season total of his career, and his 15 playoff points helped the Canadiens win the Stanley Cup in 1993.

As his career was winding down, Bellows played for the Tampa Bay Lightning, Mighty Ducks of Anaheim and the Washington Capitals. In the 1997–98 season the Capitals made it to the Stanley Cup Finals, but lost to the Detroit Red Wings. En route to the Eastern Conference championship, Bellows scored the series-clinching overtime goal in the first round in Game 6 against the Boston Bruins. The 1998–99 season was his last. On January 2, 1999, Bellows scored his 1,000th career regular season point, becoming the 54th NHL player to reach that plateau.

Bellows was named to the 1990 second All-Star team, and played in three NHL All-Star Games (1984, 1988 and 1992). He retired with 485 goals, 537 assists and 1,022 points. He was named the top forward at the 1989 World Ice Hockey Championships, as Canada won the silver medal.

Personal life
Bellows lives in Edina, Minnesota, and works in Minneapolis as a broker at investment bank Piper Jaffray.

Bellows's son Kieffer Bellows in 2016 was drafted in the first round, 19th overall, by the New York Islanders.

Awards
 Stanley Cup champion – 1993
 3× NHL All-Star Game selection: 1984, 1988 and 1992
 NHL second All-Star team – 1990

Career statistics

Regular season and playoffs

International

See also

 List of NHL players with 1,000 points
 List of NHL players with 1,000 games played

References

External links
 
 Profile at hockeydraftcentral.com

1964 births
Living people
Berlin Capitals players
Canadian ice hockey right wingers
Ice hockey people from Ontario
Kitchener Rangers players
Mighty Ducks of Anaheim players
Minnesota North Stars draft picks
Minnesota North Stars players
Montreal Canadiens players
National Hockey League first-round draft picks
Sportspeople from St. Catharines
Stanley Cup champions
Tampa Bay Lightning players
Washington Capitals players
Canadian expatriate ice hockey players in Germany